Greg Koch (born June 14, 1955) is a former American football tackle and guard who played eleven seasons in the National Football League (NFL), mainly  with the Green Bay Packers. In 2010, Koch was inducted into the Green Bay Packers Hall of Fame.  Koch was also inducted into the University of Arkansas Sports Hall of Honor in 2010. He was inducted in the State of Arkansas Sports Hall of Fame in March 2016. He is a licensed attorney and was co-host of In The Trenches with  Koch and Kalu on SportsTalk 790 KBME in Houston, Texas until retiring in 2019. Koch is also known for his 16-hour drinking contest with former WWE star Lex  Luger. Koch was included in The 100 greatest Packers Players for the 100 year celebration of the NFL checking in at number 67.

College career
Koch was a four-year letterman at the University of Arkansas. He was a starter for the Arkansas Razorbacks where he was part of the offensive line that blocked for the school record 3,523 rushing yards in 1975. That same season Koch was a First-team All-SWC. Koch played in the All-America Bowl in Tampa, Florida after the 1976 season. Koch was named the Razorback 1970s All-Decade team with offensive linemen R. C. Thielemann, Leotis Harris, George Stewart, and Greg Kolenda.

Professional career

Green Bay Packers
A second-round draft choice in 1977 from the University of Arkansas, Koch played nine seasons (1977–85) in Green Bay, appearing in 133 games. A fixture at right tackle almost immediately upon his arrival, he was a Second-team All-Pro selection following the 1982 season and was part of one of the greatest offenses in club history when the Packers amassed 6,172 yards in 1983, the second-best output ever in club annals.

Miami Dolphins
Koch played his final two seasons with Miami in 1986 and the 1st game of 1987 at his customary right tackle spot. Rumor has it, while he was with the Dolphins, Koch lost an epic drinking battle with Lawrence Wendell Pfohl better known by the ring name Lex Luger. Some reports have the match lasting upwards of 15 hours. After the strike in 1987, his former Packer offensive coordinator Bob Schnelker traded two draft choices for him in Minnesota.

Minnesota Vikings
He played right guard for the Vikings in 1987 where they made it to the NFC Championship game, eventually losing to the Washington Redskins. Despite being wanted back by the Vikings in 1988, he then went to law school and has been a practicing attorney and part-time radio host in Houston Texas since 1992.

References

1955 births
Living people
American football offensive linemen
Green Bay Packers players
Miami Dolphins players
Minnesota Vikings players
Arkansas Razorbacks football players
People from Bethesda, Maryland
Players of American football from Maryland